Hamad Al-Yami (born 17 May 1999), is a Saudi Arabian professional footballer who plays as a right-back for Saudi Professional League side Al Hilal.

Career statistics

Club

Honours

Club
Al-Hilal
 AFC Champions League: 2021
 Saudi Super Cup: 2021
 Saudi Professional League: 2021–22

International
Saudi Arabia U23
AFC U-23 Asian Cup: 2022

References

External links
 

1999 births
Living people
People from Khobar
Association football fullbacks
Association football wingers
Saudi Arabian footballers
Saudi Arabia youth international footballers
Saudi Professional League players
Saudi First Division League players
Al-Qadsiah FC players
Al Hilal SFC players
Olympic footballers of Saudi Arabia
Footballers at the 2020 Summer Olympics